Kamal al-Shawish is a Yemeni human rights activist who was kidnapped by the Houthi militia in August 2018 in the city of Hodeidah.

Shawish is a researcher for Mwatana Organization for Human Rights in Hodeidah, where he was reporting on human rights violations against civilians.

Mwatana released a statement that Shawish had been detained on Sanaa Street when "two-armed men blindfolded Al Shawish and pulled him towards a gold-color car taking him to an unknown location". Middle East Monitor noted that Mwatana had been particularly targeted, and Executive Director Abdulrasheed Al-Faqih and Chairperson Radhya Al-Mutawakel had both been temporarily detained in June 2018.

Amnesty International's Lynn Maalouf commented that “The worrying abduction of Kamal al-Shawish seems to be part of a sinister pattern of harassment and repression of human rights work in Yemen, committed by all sides to the conflict”. The Gulf Center for Human Rights also called on the Houthi militia to release al-Shawish.

References 

Living people
Yemeni human rights activists
Year of birth missing (living people)
Place of birth missing (living people)
Kidnapped Yemeni people